The Tokyo Disneyland Hotel is the third Disney-brand hotel of the Tokyo Disney Resort. Also, it is the fourth Disneyland Hotel. It is located directly in front of the Tokyo Disneyland park with the Tokyo Disneyland station of the Disney Resort Line monorail system in between. The hotel was designed to reflect early 20th century Victorian architectural style, and to blend with the World Bazaar area of Tokyo Disneyland, the monorail station and the main entrance area.

Opening
The hotel opened on July 8, 2008, and offers 701 guest rooms including themed character rooms, along with dining and shopping facilities.

Restaurants
The following are restaurants located inside of the Tokyo Disneyland Hotel:
Canna (fine dining restaurant)
Dreamers Lounge (lobby restaurant)
Sherwood Garden (buffet restaurant)

References

Hotels in Tokyo Disney Resort
Hotel buildings completed in 2008
Hotels established in 2008